Conasprella traversiana is a species of sea snail, a marine gastropod mollusk in the family Conidae, the cone snails and their allies.

Description
The size of the shell varies between 19 mm and 43 mm.

Distribution
This marine species occurs off Aden and Somalia

References

 Smith, E. A. 1875. Description of a new species of Conus. Quarterly Journal of Conchology 1:107–108, 1 fig.
 Puillandre N., Duda T.F., Meyer C., Olivera B.M. & Bouchet P. (2015). One, four or 100 genera? A new classification of the cone snails. Journal of Molluscan Studies. 81: 1–23

External links
 

traversiana
Gastropods described in 1875